The Old United States Courthouse and Post Office building is a former post office and courthouse of the United States federal courts in Frankfort, Kentucky. Built during 1883 to 1887, the structure housed the United States District Court for the District of Kentucky from then until 1901 and the United States District Court for the Eastern District of Kentucky from 1901 until it was succeeded.

It was expanded with a rear wing in 1910 at which time interior offices were modified as well, to serve as a post office, which it did until 1965.  In 1965 it housed the Paul Sawyier Library until 2008 when the library moved to the brick building next door. Today it is Downtown Annex for Kentucky State University. The building was listed on the National Register of Historic Places in 1974.

The limestone building with a steeply sloped slate roof was designed in the Second Empire and Châteauesque styles. It is a three-story  by  building built of masonry load-bearing walls with timber beams and trusses.

Gallery

See also 
 National Register of Historic Places listings in Franklin County, Kentucky
 Corner in Celebrities Historic District
 List of United States post offices

References

External links 

Historic Federal Courthouses page for the Frankfort, Kentucky, United States Court House and Post Office from the Federal Judicial Center.

Libraries on the National Register of Historic Places in Kentucky
Government buildings completed in 1887
Courthouses on the National Register of Historic Places in Kentucky
Post office buildings on the National Register of Historic Places in Kentucky
Châteauesque architecture in the United States
Former federal courthouses in the United States
Renaissance Revival architecture in Kentucky
National Register of Historic Places in Frankfort, Kentucky
1887 establishments in Kentucky
Kentucky State University